Argylia uspallatensis is a species of perennial plant in the family Bignoniaceae. It is found in Chile and Argentina.

References

External links

uspallatensis